Troglocambarus is a monotypic genus of troglobitic crayfish, endemic to Florida. Troglocambarus maclanei is found underground in Hernando, Marion, Alachua, Columbia, Gilchrist and Suwanee counties, and is named after Mr. William A. McLane who first collected it. It is commonly called the 'North Florida Spider Cave crayfish.Troglocambarus is believed to be the sister group to Procambarus. It is only found in subterranean waters and was first recorded in Squirrel Chimney, 11 miles north-west of Gainesville, Florida. T. maclanei has no body pigment. It is distinguished from other genera by the great enlargement of the third maxillipeds. It is unknown what T. maclanei feeds on.Troglocambarus maclanei is listed as "Critically Imperiled" by NatureServe, and as Near Threatened'' on the IUCN Red List.

References

Cambaridae
Endemic fauna of Florida
Freshwater crustaceans of North America
Cave crayfish
Monotypic crustacean genera
Crustaceans described in 1942
Taxa named by Horton H. Hobbs Jr.